Vidar Stenborg (21 May 1894 – 30 July 1960) was a Swedish footballer who played as a defender. He made two appearances for the Sweden national team and was a part of Sweden's 1920 Summer Olympics squad. He won the 1921 Swedish Championship with IFK Eskilstuna.

Honours 
IFK Eskilstuna
 Swedish Champion: 1921

References

External links
 

1894 births
1960 deaths
Swedish footballers
Association football defenders
Sweden international footballers
People from Eskilstuna
Sportspeople from Södermanland County